The 2008–09 season of the Libyan Division I Basketball League.

Standings

Results

See also 
 Libyan Division I Basketball League
 Libya national basketball team
 Libyan Arab Basketball Federation

Libyan Division I Basketball League by season